Kenny Larkin (who also releases as Dark Comedy) is an American techno producer from Detroit. He has been described by AllMusic as "massively influential" on American, British, and German techno.

Larkin was born in 1968 and raised in Detroit, but did not participate in the early years of Detroit techno because he was serving in the military. Upon his return, he began producing, influenced by Juan Atkins and Derrick May, as well as the Chicago house music scene. His early single releases, "We Shall Overcome" and "Integration", were issued on Plus 8, a label overseen by Richie Hawtin and John Acquaviva; later releases appeared on Buzz and Warp as well as other labels. His records have seen more success in continental Europe than in the U.S.

Late in the 1990s, Larkin began working as a stand-up comedian into the 2000s. His musical output has slowed down as a result.

Discography

As Kenny Larkin

We Shall Overcome Synthpunk  (12"), Plus 8 Records, 1990
Integration (12"),  Plus 8 Records,  1991
Azimuth (LP), Warp Records, 1994
Catatonic (12"), R & S Records, 1994 
Chasers / The Shit (12"), Distance, 1995 
Metaphor (LP), R & S Records, 1995
Loop 2 (12"), R & S Records, 1996
Smile / Life (12"), KMS, 1999
Ancient Beats / Seduce Her (12"), Peacefrog Records 2004 
Let Me Think (12"), Peacefrog Records, 2004 
Art of Dance (LP), Distance Records, 1998
The Narcissist (LP), Peacefrog Records, 2004
Dark Comedy Pt 1 (12"), Rush Hour Recordings, 2006 
Dark Comedy Pt 2 (12"), Rush Hour Recordings, 2006 
You Are... (12"), Planet E Records, 2008
Keys, Strings, Tambourines (LP), Planet E Records, 2008

As Dark ComedyCorbomite Maneuver EP (12"), TransmatWar of the Worlds / Without a Sound (12"), Art of Dance, 1992Seven Days (12"), Elypsia, 1996Plankton / Clavia's North (12"), Art of Dance, 1997Seven Days (LP),  Elypsia, 1997Funkfaker Music Saves My Soul (12"), Poussez!, 2004Funkfaker: Music Saves My Soul (LP), Poussez!, 2005Good God'' (12"), Poussez!, 2005

References

External links
 Kenny Larkin discography at Discogs.

American techno musicians
Musicians from Detroit
Living people
1968 births
Peacefrog Records artists